Doru Ana (28 February 1954 – 11 October 2022) was a Romanian actor. He appeared in more than forty films since 1980. Ana died in Bucharest on 11 October 2022, at the age of 68.

Selected filmography

References

External links 

 

1954 births
2022 deaths
Male actors from Bucharest
Romanian male film actors
20th-century Romanian male actors
21st-century Romanian male actors
Caragiale National University of Theatre and Film alumni